Jack Michael Morillo (born 26 October 1986) is a Dominican footballer who plays as a forward. He played at the 2014 FIFA World Cup qualifier.

References 

 
 ligamayor.do

1986 births
Living people
Association football midfielders
Dominican Republic footballers
Dominican Republic international footballers